Marcus Piehl (born 23 August 1985) is a freestyle swimmer from Sweden. He was a member of the Swedish swimming team 2002–2009. His best performance was relay in short course. The Swedish team won the European Championship in 2006 and 2007. The Swedish team was Petter Stymne, Jonas Tilly and Stefan Nystrand.

Clubs
 Linköpings ASS

References

External links
 

1985 births
Living people
Swedish male freestyle swimmers
Medalists at the FINA World Swimming Championships (25 m)
European Aquatics Championships medalists in swimming
Linköpings ASS swimmers